

Events

January

 January 1 – Anastasio Somoza García becomes President of Nicaragua.
 January 5 – Water levels begin to rise in the Ohio River in the United States, leading to the Ohio River flood of 1937, which continues into February, leaving 1 million people homeless and 385 people dead.
 January 15 – Spanish Civil War: Second Battle of the Corunna Road ends inconclusively.
 January 20 – Second inauguration of Franklin D. Roosevelt: Franklin D. Roosevelt is sworn in for a second term as President of the United States. This is the first time that the United States presidential inauguration occurs on this date; the change is due to the ratification in 1933 of the Twentieth Amendment to the United States Constitution.
 January 23 – Moscow Trials: Trial of the Anti-Soviet Trotskyist Center – In the Soviet Union 17 leading Communists go on trial, accused of participating in a plot led by Leon Trotsky to overthrow Joseph Stalin's regime, and assassinate its leaders.

February

 February 8 – Spanish Civil War: Falangist troops take Málaga.
 February 8 – February 27 – Spanish Civil War – Battle of Jarama: Nationalist and Republican troops fight to a stalemate.
 February 16 – Wallace H. Carothers receives a patent for nylon in the United States.
 February 19
 Airliner VH-UHH (Stinson) goes down over Lamington National Park, bound for Sydney, killing 5 people.
 Yekatit 12: During a public ceremony at the Viceregal Palace (the former Imperial residence) in Addis Ababa, Ethiopia, two Eritrean nationalists attempt to kill viceroy Rodolfo Graziani with a number of grenades. Italian security guards fire into the crowd of Ethiopian onlookers. Authorities exact further reprisals, which include indiscriminately slaughtering native Ethiopians over the next 3 days, detaining thousands of Ethiopians at Danan and slaughtering almost 300 monks at the Debre Libanos Monastery.
 The flag of the Netherlands is officially adopted.
 February 20 – Roberto Ortiz is elected president of Argentina.
 February 21 – The League of Nations Non-Intervention Committee prohibits foreign nationals from fighting in the Spanish Civil War.
 February 25 – Hergé's Tintin adventure The Broken Ear (L'Oreille cassée) concludes serialization in the Belgian weekly newspaper supplement Le Petit Vingtième, and soon afterwards is published as a book in black and white.

March

 March 10 (dated March 14 (Passion Sunday)) – The encyclical Mit brennender Sorge ("With burning concern") of Pope Pius XI is published in Germany in the German language. Largely the work of Cardinals von Faulhaber and Pacelli, it condemns breaches of the 1933 Reichskonkordat agreement signed between the Nazi government and the Catholic Church, and criticises Nazism's views on race and other matters incompatible with Catholicism. 
 March 18 – New London School explosion: In the worst school disaster in American history in terms of lives lost, the New London School in New London, Texas, suffers a catastrophic natural gas explosion, killing in excess of 295 students and teachers. Mother Frances Hospital opens in Tyler, Texas, a day ahead of schedule, in response to the explosion.
 March 19 – The encyclical Divini Redemptoris of Pope Pius XI, critical of communism, is published.
 March 21 – Ponce massacre: A police squad, acting under orders from Governor of Puerto Rico Blanton Winship, opens fire on peaceful demonstrators protesting at the arrest of Puerto Rican Nationalist Party leader Pedro Albizu Campos, killing 17 people and injuring over 200.

April

 April 1
 Aden becomes a British crown colony.
 The Bombing of Jaén is carried out in Spain, by the Condor Legion of the Nazi German Luftwaffe.
 April 9 – The Kamikaze arrives at Croydon Airport in London; it is the first Japanese-built aircraft to fly to Europe.
 April 12 – Frank Whittle ground-tests the world's first jet engine designed to power an aircraft, at Rugby, England.
 April 20 – A fire in an elementary school in Kilingi-Nõmme, Estonia, kills 17 students and injures 50.
 April 26 – Spanish Civil War: The Bombing of Guernica is carried out in Spain, by the Condor Legion of the Nazi German Luftwaffe, in support of the Francoists. Three-quarters of the town is destroyed and hundreds killed.

May

 May 6 – Hindenburg disaster: In the United States, the German airship Hindenburg bursts into flame when mooring to a mast in Lakehurst, New Jersey. Of the 36 passengers and 61 crew on board, 13 passengers and 22 crew die, as well as one member of the ground crew.
 May 7 – Spanish Civil War: The German Condor Legion Fighter Group, equipped with Heinkel He 51 biplanes, arrives in Spain to assist Francisco Franco's forces.
 May 8 – Wydad Athletic Club (WAC)(Arabic: نادي الوداد الرياضي; Berber: Wydad Dar al-Beida; commonly: Wydad al ouma) is established in Casablanca, Morocco; it will be best known for its Casablanca Association football team.
 May 12 – George VI and Elizabeth are crowned King and Queen of the United Kingdom and the British Dominions, and Emperor and Empress of India at Westminster Abbey, London.
 May 21
 A Soviet station becomes the first scientific research settlement to operate on the drift ice of the Arctic Ocean.
 As one of the reprisals for the attempted assassination of Italian viceroy Rodolfo Graziani, a detachment of Italian troops massacres the entire community of Debre Libanos, killing 297 monks and 23 laymen.
 May 28
 Neville Chamberlain becomes Prime Minister of the United Kingdom, following the retirement of Stanley Baldwin.
 May 30
 Spanish Civil War: Spanish ship Ciudad de Barcelona is torpedoed.
 Memorial Day massacre of 1937: The Chicago Police Department shoot and kill 10 unarmed demonstrators in Chicago.

June

 June – Picasso completes his painting Guernica.
 June – July – The Dáil Éireann debates and passes the new  draft Constitution of Ireland, which is then submitted for public approval by plebiscite.
 June 3 – Wallis Simpson marries the Duke of Windsor, the former Edward VIII, in France.
 June 8
 The Dáil Éireann passes the Executive Authority (Consequential Provisions) Act, 1937, which abolishes the office of Governor-General of the Irish Free State,  retrospectively dated to December 1936.
 The first total solar eclipse to exceed 7 minutes of totality, in over 800 years, is visible in the Pacific and Peru.
 June 21 – The coalition government of Léon Blum resigns in France.

July

 July 1
 The Gestapo arrests pastor Martin Niemöller in Germany.
 In a referendum the people of the Irish Free State accept the new Constitution by 685,105 votes to 527,945.
 July 2 – Amelia Earhart and navigator Fred Noonan disappear after taking off from New Guinea, during Earhart's attempt to become the first woman to fly around the world.
 July 7
 In the Marco Polo Bridge Incident, Japanese and Chinese forces exchange fire near Beijing, beginning the Second Sino-Japanese War.
 The Peel Commission proposes partition of the British Mandate of Palestine into separate Arab and Jewish states.
 July 9 – 1937 Fox vault fire: The silent film archives of Fox Film Corporation are destroyed
 July 20 – The Geibeltbad Pirna is opened in Dresden, Germany.
 July 21 – Éamon de Valera is elected President of the Executive Council (prime minister) of the Irish Free State, by the Dáil (parliament).
 July 22 – New Deal: The United States Senate votes down President Franklin D. Roosevelt's proposal to add more justices to the Supreme Court of the United States.
 July 25–31 – Sino-Japanese War: Battle of Beiping–Tianjin, a series of actions fought around Beiping and Tianjin, result in Japanese victory.
 July 29 – Tungchow Mutiny: Units of the East Hopei Army mutiny and kill Japanese troops and civilians in Tongzhou.
 July 31 – NKVD Operative Order 00447 "Об операции по репрессированию бывших кулаков, уголовников и других антисоветских элементов" ("The operation for repression of former kulaks, criminals and other anti-Soviet elements") is approved by the Politburo of the Soviet Union, initially as a 4-month plan for 75,950 people to be executed and an additional 193,000 to be sent to the Gulag.

August

 August 2 – The Marijuana Tax Act in the United States is a significant bill on the path that will lead to the criminalization of cannabis. It was introduced to the U.S. Congress by Commissioner of the Federal Bureau of Narcotics, Harry Anslinger.
 August 5 – The Soviet Union commences one of the largest campaigns of the Great Purge, to "eliminate anti-Soviet elements". Within the following year, at least 724,000 people are killed on order of the troikas, directed by Joseph Stalin. This is an offensive that targets social classes (such as the kulaks), ethnic or racial backgrounds which are seen as non-Russian, and Stalin's personal opponents from the Communist Party and their sympathizers. 
 August 6 – Spanish Civil War: Falangist artillery bombards Madrid.
 August 8 – Japan occupies Beijing.
 August 9 – The Polish Operation of the NKVD (1937–38) is signed by Nikolai Yezhov, as a continuation of the Great Purge.
 August 13 – Second Sino-Japanese War: The Battle of Shanghai opens.
 August 26 – Second Sino-Japanese War: Japanese aircraft attack the car carrying the ambassador of Great Britain, during a raid on Shanghai.

September

 September 2 – The Great Hong Kong Typhoon kills an estimated 11,000 persons.
 September 5 – Spanish Civil War: The city of Llanes falls to the Falangists.
 September 7 – CBS broadcasts a two-and-a-half hour memorial concert nationwide on radio in memory of George Gershwin, live from the Hollywood Bowl. Many celebrities appear, including Oscar Levant, Fred Astaire, Otto Klemperer, Lily Pons and members of the original cast of Porgy and Bess. The concert is recorded and released complete years later in what is excellent sound for its time, on CD. The Los Angeles Philharmonic is the featured orchestra.
 September 10 – Nine nations meet in the Nyon Conference, led by the United Kingdom and France, to address international piracy in the Mediterranean.
 September 17 – Abraham Lincoln's head is dedicated at Mount Rushmore.
 September 19 – Swiss professional ice hockey club HC Ambrì-Piotta is founded.
 September 21 – George Allen & Unwin, Ltd. of London publishes the first edition of J. R. R. Tolkien's The Hobbit.
 September 25 – Second Sino-Japanese War - Battle of Pingxingguan: The Communist Chinese Eighth Route Army defeats the Japanese.
 September 27 – The last Bali tiger dies.
 September 30 – Austrian born actress of Jewish descent, Hedy Lamarr arrives in New York City to flee from her possessive husband Friedrich Mandl who made arms agreements with the Nazis, and to begin her Hollywood career.

October

 October 1
 The Marihuana Tax Act becomes law in the United States.
 October 2–8 – Parsley Massacre: Under the orders of President Rafael Trujillo, Dominican troops kill thousands of Haitians living in the Dominican Republic.
 October 3 – Second Sino-Japanese War: Japanese troops advance toward Nanking, capital of the Republic of China.
 October 5 – Roosevelt gives his famous Quarantine Speech in Chicago.
 October 9 – Jimmie Angel lands his plane on top of Devil's Mountain; however, the plane gets damaged, and he has to trek through the rainforest for help.
 October 11 – Duke and Duchess of Windsor's 1937 tour of Germany: The Duke and Duchess of Windsor arrive in Berlin to begin a 12-day tour of Nazi Germany, meeting Adolf Hitler on the 22nd.
 October 13 – Germany, in a note to Brussels, guarantees the inviolability and integrity of Belgium, so long as the latter abstains from military action against Germany.
 October 15 – Ernest Hemingway's novel To Have and Have Not is first published, in the United States.
 October 18–October 21 – Spanish Civil War: The whole Spanish northern seaboard falls into the Falangists' hands; Republican forces in Gijón, Spain, set fire to petrol reserves, prior to retreating before the advancing Falangists.
 October 23 – 1937 Australian federal election: Joseph Lyons' UAP/Country Coalition Government is re-elected with a slightly increased majority, defeating the Labor Party led by John Curtin.
 October 25 – Celâl Bayar forms the new (ninth) government of Turkey.

November

 November 5 – World War II: In the Reich Chancellery, Adolf Hitler holds a secret meeting and states his plans for acquiring "living space" for the German people (recorded in the Hossbach Memorandum).
 November 6 – Italy joins the Anti-Comintern Pact.
 November 9 – Second Sino-Japanese War: Japanese troops take Shanghai.
 November 10 – Brazilian president Getúlio Vargas announces the Estado Novo ("New State"), thence becoming dictator of Brazil until 1945.
 November 11 – The Kogushi Sulfur Mine collapse, in western Gunma, Japan, kills at least 245 people.

December

 December 1 – Second Sino-Japanese War: The Battle of Nanking begins.
 December 4 – The Dandy comic is first published in Scotland; it continued until 2012 as a physical publication, then online until 2013.
 December 11 – Italy withdraws from the League of Nations.
 December 12
 USS Panay incident: Japanese bombers sink the American gunboat  on the Yangtze in China; the United States accepts the Japanese statement that this was unintentional.
 Mae West makes a risqué guest appearance on NBC's Chase and Sanborn Hour, which eventually results in her being banned from radio.
 December 13 – Second Sino-Japanese War: The Battle of Nanking ends with the Japanese occupying the city. In the Nanking Massacre which follows, Japanese soldiers kill over 300,000 Chinese in 3 months. A few days previously, the Nationalist government of China had moved its capital to the southwestern city Chungking (Chongqing).
 December 16 – The original production of the musical Me and My Girl opens at the Victoria Palace Theatre, in London's West End. A later revival will win an award.
 December 21 – Walt Disney's Snow White and the Seven Dwarfs, the world's first feature-length animated film, premieres at the Carthay Circle Theatre in Los Angeles.
 December 25 – At the age of 70, conductor Arturo Toscanini conducts the NBC Symphony Orchestra on radio for the first time, beginning his successful 17-year tenure with that orchestra. This first concert consists of music by Vivaldi (at a time when he is seldom played), Mozart, and Brahms. Millions tune in to listen, including U.S. President Franklin Delano Roosevelt.
 December 29 – The new Constitution of Ireland (Bunreacht na hÉireann) comes into force. The Irish Free State becomes "Ireland", and Éamon de Valera becomes the first Taoiseach (prime minister) of the new state. A Presidential Commission (made up the Chief Justice, the Speaker of Dáil Éireann, and the President of the High Court) assumes the powers of the new presidency, pending the popular election of the first President of Ireland in June 1938. The new constitution prohibits divorce.

Date unknown
 Switzerland begins construction of its Border Line defences.
 The Vibora Luviminda sugar plantation trade unions strike on Maui island, Hawaii.
 Italian psychiatrist Amarro Fiamberti is the first to document a transorbital approach to the brain, which becomes the basis for the controversial medical procedure of transorbital lobotomy.
 Soviet industry produces about four times as much as it had in 1928.
 The Allen Organ Company, builder of church, home and theatre organs, is founded in Macungie, Pennsylvania.

Births

January

 January 1 – Philip Akot Akok Kiir, South Sudanese pastor, former educator and politician
 January 4
 Grace Bumbry, American opera singer
 Dyan Cannon, American actress, film director and screenwriter
 January 6 
 Paolo Conte, Italian singer, pianist and composer
 Harri Holkeri, 36th Prime Minister of Finland (d. 2011)
 January 8 – Dame Shirley Bassey, Welsh singer
 January 13 – Ati George Sokomanu, President of Vanuatu
 January 15 – Margaret O'Brien, American child actress
 January 16 – Francis George, American cardinal (d. 2015)
 January 18
 Yukio Endō, Japanese gymnast (d. 2009)
 John Hume, Northern Irish politician, Nobel Peace Prize laureate (d. 2020)
 January 19 – Princess Birgitta of Sweden 
 January 21 – Prince Max, Duke in Bavaria, heir to the Bavarian Royal House
 January 22 – Joseph Wambaugh, American author
 January 25 – Ange-Félix Patassé, 5th President of Central African Republic (d. 2011)
 January 30
 Vanessa Redgrave, British actress
 Boris Spassky, Russian chess grandmaster
 January 31
 Philip Glass, American composer
 Suzanne Pleshette, American actress (d. 2008)

February

 February 1 – Don Everly, American rock and roll singer and musician (d. 2021)
 February 2
 Tom Smothers, American musician, comedian (The Smothers Brothers)
 Eric Arturo Delvalle, Panamanian lawyer (d. 2015)
 February 4 – Magnar Solberg, Norwegian biathlete
 February 5 – Gaston Roelants, Belgian Olympic athlete
 February 8 – Harry Wu, Chinese human rights activist (d. 2016)
 February 10 – Roberta Flack, African-American singer
 February 11 – Bill Lawry, Australian cricketer
 February 12 – Charles Dumas, American athlete (d. 2004)
 February 13 – Rupiah Banda, 4th President of Zambia (d. 2022)
 February 20
 Robert Huber, German chemist and Nobel laureate
 Nancy Wilson, African-American singer and actress (d. 2018)
 February 21
 Ron Clarke, Australian runner (d. 2015)
 King Harald V of Norway
 Jilly Cooper, English writer
 February 25 – Sir Tom Courtenay, English actor

March

 March 2 – Abdelaziz Bouteflika, President of Algeria (d. 2021)
 March 3 – Bobby Driscoll, American child actor and voice actor (d. 1968)
 March 4
 Graham Dowling, New Zealand cricketer
 Yuri Senkevich, Russian cosmonaut (d. 2003)
 March 5 – Olusegun Obasanjo, President of Nigeria
 March 6 – Valentina Tereshkova, Russian cosmonaut, first woman in space
 March 8 – Juvénal Habyarimana, 3rd President of Rwanda (d. 1994)
 March 14 – Benny Paret, Cuban welterweight boxer (d. 1962)
 March 15 – Valentin Rasputin, Russian writer (d. 2015)
 March 18 
 Aleksei Zasukhin, Soviet boxer (d. 1996)
 Rudi Altig, German road racing cyclist (d. 2016)
 March 22
 Armin Hary, German athlete
 Foo Foo Lammar, British drag queen (d. 2003)
 Peter Vogel, German film actor (d. 1978)
 March 23 – Tony Burton, American actor (d. 2016)
 March 24 – Lloyd Erskine Sandiford, 4th Prime Minister of Barbados
 March 29 
 Billy Carter, American farmer, businessman, brewer, and politician (d. 1988)
 Smarck Michel, 6th Prime Minister of Haiti (d. 2012)
 March 30 – Warren Beatty, American actor and director

April

 April 1 – Mohammad Hamid Ansari, Indian politician, 12th Vice President of India
 April 4 – Obed Dlamini, 6th Prime Minister of Swaziland (d. 2017)
 April 5
 Colin Powell, American politician (d. 2021)
 Guido Vildoso, 59th President of Bolivia
 April 6
 Merle Haggard, American country musician (d. 2016)
 Billy Dee Williams, African-American actor
 April 10 – Bella Akhmadulina, Russian poet (d. 2010)
 April 17 – Ferdinand Piëch, Austrian engineer, business magnate (d. 2019)
 April 19
 Antonio Carluccio, Italian-born restaurateur (d. 2017)
 Joseph Estrada, Filipino actor and politician, 13th President of the Philippines
 April 20 – George Takei, Japanese-American actor, director and author (Star Trek)
 April 22 – Jack Nicholson, American film actor and director
 April 24
 Viktor Zubkov, Russian basketball player (d. 2016)
 Joe Henderson, American jazz tenor saxophonist (d. 2001)
 April 26 – Jean-Pierre Beltoise, French racing driver (d. 2015)
 April 27 – Sandy Dennis, American actress (d. 1992)
 April 28 – Saddam Hussein, 5th President of Iraq (d. 2006)

May

 May 2 – Lorenzo Music, American actor, voice actor, writer, producer and musician (d. 2001)
 May 4 – Dick Dale, American guitarist (d. 2019)
 May 6 – Rubin "Hurricane" Carter, African-American boxer (d. 2014)
 May 8
 Carlos Gaviria Díaz, Colombian justice, politician
 Thomas Pynchon, American writer
 May 9 – Rafael Moneo, Spanish architect
 May 11 – Ildikó Újlaky-Rejtő, Hungarian Olympic and world champion foil fencer
 May 12 – George Carlin, American stand-up comedian (d. 2008)
 May 13 – Roger Zelazny, American writer (d. 1995)
 May 15
 Madeleine Albright, Czechoslovakian-born American politician and diplomat (d. 2022)
 Trini Lopez, American singer, guitarist, and actor (d. 2020)
 May 16
 Yvonne Craig, American actress (Batman) (d. 2015)
 Robert B. Wilson, American economist, Nobel Prize laureate
 May 18 – Jacques Santer, Luxembourg politician, 20th Prime Minister of Luxembourg
 May 21
 Ricardo Alarcón, Cuban politician  (d. 2022)
 Sofiko Chiaureli, Georgian actress (d. 2008)
 Mengistu Haile Mariam, President of Ethiopia
 May 22 – Facundo Cabral, Argentine singer (d. 2011)

June

 June 1 
 Morgan Freeman, African-American actor
 Colleen McCullough, Australian author (d. 2015)
 Ezio Pascutti, Italian footballer (d. 2017)
 June 7 – Neeme Järvi, Estonian conductor
 June 8 – Bruce McCandless II, American astronaut (d. 2017)	
 June 11 – Robin Warren, Australian pathologist, recipient of the Nobel Prize in Physiology or Medicine
 June 12 – Vladimir Arnold, Soviet-Russian mathematician (d. 2010)
 June 13 – Raj Reddy, Indian computer scientist
 June 15 – Waylon Jennings, American country singer (d. 2002)
 June 16 
 Simeon Saxe-Coburg-Gotha, Tsar of Bulgaria (1943-1946), 48th Prime Minister of Bulgaria (2001-2005)
 Erich Segal, American author, screenwriter, and educator (d. 2010)
 June 18
 Ronald Venetiaan, 6th and 8th President of Suriname
 Vitaly Zholobov, Soviet cosmonaut
 June 19 – André Glucksmann, French philosopher, author (d. 2015)
 June 23 – Martti Ahtisaari, 10th President of Finland
 June 25
 Nawaf Al-Ahmad Al-Jaber Al-Sabah, Emir of Kuwait
 Keizō Obuchi, 54th Prime Minister of Japan (d. 2000)
 June 26 – Robert Coleman Richardson, American physicist, Nobel Prize laureate (d. 2013)

July

 July 2 – Richard Petty, American stock car racer, 7-time NASCAR Winston Cup champion
 July 3 – Tom Stoppard, Czech-born British playwright and screenwriter
 July 4 – Queen Sonja of Norway
 July 5 – Jo de Roo, Dutch road racing cyclist
 July 6
 Vladimir Ashkenazy, Russian pianist
 Ned Beatty, American actor (d. 2021)
 Michael Sata, 5th President of Zambia (d. 2014)
 July 7 
 Lars-Erik Larsson, Swedish rowing coxswain
 Nanami Shiono, Japanese author, novelist
 Tung Chee-hwa, Hong Kong businessman and politician
 Giovanni Arrighi, Italian economist, sociologist and world-systems analyst (d. 2009)
 July 9 – David Hockney, English-born artist
 July 12
 Bill Cosby, African-American actor, comedian, educator and convicted sex offender
 Lionel Jospin, Prime Minister of France
 July 14 – Yoshirō Mori, 55th Prime Minister of Japan
 July 17 – Jaberi Bidandi Ssali, Ugandan politician, businessman
 July 18
 Roald Hoffmann, Polish-born chemist and Nobel laureate
 Hunter S. Thompson, American author and journalist (d. 2005)
 July 24 – Manoj Kumar, Indian actor and director	
 July 27 – Mirko Marjanović, 63rd Prime Minister of Serbia (d. 2006)
 July 29 
 Ryutaro Hashimoto, 53rd Prime Minister of Japan (d. 2006)
 Daniel McFadden, American economist and Nobel laureate

August

 August 2 – María Duval, Mexican actress and singer
 August 3 – Andrés Gimeno, Spanish tennis player (d. 2019)
 August 5 – Manuel Pinto da Costa, Santoméan politician, 1st President of São Tomé and Príncipe
 August 6 – Charlie Haden, American jazz bassist (d. 2014)
 August 8 
 Dustin Hoffman, American actor, director (The Graduate)
 S. Dhanabalan, Singaporean politician
 August 11 – Dieter Kemper, German cyclist (d. 2018)
 August 15 – Bounnhang Vorachith, 14th Prime Minister, 6th President of Laos
 August 18 – Jean Alingué Bawoyeu, Chadian politician, former Prime Minister
 August 21
 Donald Dewar, First Minister of Scotland (d. 2000)
 Gustavo Noboa, President of Ecuador (d. 2021)
 August 22
 Rima Melati, Indonesian actress and singer (d. 2022)
 Francesco Musso, Italian Olympic boxer
 August 26 – Gennady Yanayev, former Soviet leader (d. 2010)
 August 27 – Alice Coltrane, African-American jazz harpist, organist, pianist and composer (d. 2007)
 August 30 – Bruce McLaren, New Zealand founder of McLaren Racing (d. 1970)

September

 September 1 – Francisco Pinto Balsemão, Portuguese politician, 111th Prime Minister of Portugal
 September 4 – Dawn Fraser, Australian swimmer
 September 5 – Antonio Angelillo, Italian-Argentine footballer (d. 2018)
 September 6 - Jo Anne Worley, American Actress, Comedienne and singer
 September 7 – John Phillip Law, American actor (d. 2008)
 September 9 – Alí Rodríguez Araque, Venezuelan politician, lawyer and diplomat (d. 2018)
 September 10 – Jared Diamond, American geographer, anthropologist, and author
 September 11 – Paola Ruffo di Calabria, Italian-born Queen of the Belgians
 September 15
 Robert Lucas Jr., American economist and Nobel laureate
 Fernando de la Rúa, Argentine politician, 43rd President of Argentina (d. 2019)
 September 20 – Monica Zetterlund, Swedish singer and actress (d. 2005)
 September 26 – Jerry Weintraub, American film producer and talent agent (d. 2015)
 September 28 – Bob Schul, American Olympic athlete
 September 30 – Daniel Filho, Brazilian film producer, director, actor, and screenwriter

October

 October 2 – Johnnie Cochran, African-American attorney (d. 2005)
 October 4
 Jackie Collins, English author (d. 2015)
 Franz Vranitzky, 19th Chancellor of Austria
 October 11 – Bobby Charlton, English footballer
 October 19 – Teresa Ciepły, Polish Olympic athlete (d. 2006)
 October 20 – Wanda Jackson, American singer, songwriter, pianist and guitarist
 October 21 – Édith Scob, French film and theatre actress (d. 2019)
 October 22 – Kader Khan, Afghan-born Indian-Canadian film actor, screenwriter, comedian, and director (d. 2018)
 October 28 – Lenny Wilkens, American basketball player and coach
 October 30 – Ashaari Mohammad, Malaysian spiritual leader (d. 2010)
 October 31 – Tom Paxton, American folk singer, songwriter

November

 November 4 – Loretta Swit, American actress (M*A*S*H)
 November 5 – Chan Sek Keong, third Chief Justice of Singapore
 November 8 – Dragoslav Šekularac, Serbian footballer and manager (d. 2019)
 November 15 – Little Willie John, African-American R&B singer (d. 1968)
 November 17 – Peter Cook, English comedian, writer and actor (d. 1995)
 November 20 – Eero Mäntyranta, Finnish Olympic cross-country skier (d. 2013)
 November 21
 Ingrid Pitt, Polish-born British actress (d. 2010) 
 Marlo Thomas, American actress, producer and social activist (That Girl)
Ferenc Kósa, Hungarian film director (d. 2018)
 November 25 – Serikbolsyn Abdildin, Kazakh economist and politician (d. 2019)
 November 26 – Boris Yegorov, Russian cosmonaut (d. 1994)
 November 30 – Ridley Scott, British film director, producer

December

 December 1 – Vaira Vīķe-Freiberga, President of Latvia
 December 3 – Francisco Xavier do Amaral, 1st President of East Timor (d. 2012)
 December 6 – Ramon Torrents, Spanish artist
 December 8
 James MacArthur, American actor (d. 2010)
 Arne Næss Jr., Norwegian mountaineer, businessman (d. 2004)
 December 12 
 Connie Francis, American singer
 Michael Jeffery, 24th Governor-General of Australia (d. 2020)
 December 17 – Sergio Jiménez, Mexican actor (d. 2007)
 December 18 – Sami-ul-Haq, Pakistani cleric, politician (d. 2018)
 December 21 – Jane Fonda, American actress and activist
 December 26 – John Horton Conway, English-born mathematician (d. 2020)
 December 28 – Ratan Tata, Indian industrialist
 December 29 – Maumoon Abdul Gayoom, President of the Maldives (1978–2008)
 December 30 – Gordon Banks, English footballer (d. 2019)
 December 31
 Avram Hershko, Israeli biologist, recipient of the Nobel Prize in Chemistry
 Anthony Hopkins, Welsh actor
 Milutin Šoškić, Serbian footballer (d. 2022)

Deaths

January

 January 1
 Bhaktisiddhanta Sarasvati, Indian spiritual teacher (b. 1874)
 John Gresham Machen, American Presbyterian theologian (b. 1881)
 January 2 – Ross Alexander, American actor (b. 1907)
 January 5
 Alberto de Oliveira, Brazilian poet (b. 1857)
 Ernst Löfström, Finnish general of World War I (b. 1865)
 January 6
 André Bessette, Canadian religious leader, saint (b. 1845)
 Albert Gleaves, American admiral (b. 1858)
 January 13 – Martin Johnson, American adventurer, documentary filmmaker (plane crash) (b. 1884)
 January 15 
 Pietro Biginelli, Italian chemist (b. 1860)
 Georges Hilaire Bousquet, French scholar (b. 1845)
 January 16 – Pyotr Bark, Soviet statesman (b. 1869)
 January 17 – Richard Boleslawski, Polish film director (b. 1889)
 January 18 – Jaime Hilario Barbal, Spanish Roman Catholic religious professed and saint (executed) (b. 1889)
 January 21
 Yasin al-Hashimi, Iraqi politician and 4th Prime Minister of Iraq (b. 1884)
 Marie Prevost, Canadian actress (b. 1896)
 January 23 – Orso Mario Corbino, Italian physicist, politician (b. 1876)

February

 February 1 – Asano Nagakoto, Japanese diplomat, politician (b. 1842)
 February 2 – Reinhold Hanisch, Austrian politician, worker (b. 1884)
 February 5
 Lou Andreas-Salomé, Russian-born writer (b. 1861)
 José Nicoletti Filho, Italian revolutionary hero (b. 1871)
 February 7 – Elihu Root, American statesman, diplomat and Nobel Peace Prize recipient (b. 1845)
 February 11
 Walter Burley Griffin, American architect, town planner (b. 1876)
 Vasily Gurko, Russian general (b. 1864)
 Maria Luisa Josefa, Mexican Roman Catholic nun and venerable (b.  1866)
 Peter of Jesus Maldonado, Mexican priest, martyr and saint (b. 1892)
 February 14 
 Vicente Vilar David, Spanish Roman Catholic priest, saint and martyr (killed in battle) (b. 1889)
 Erkki Melartin, Finnish composer (b. 1875)
 February 17 – George Hassell, English actor (b. 1881)
 February 19 – Horacio Quiroga, Uruguayan writer (b. 1878)
 February 20 – Sir Percy Cox, British army general and colonial administrator (b.1864)
 February 24
 Vladimir Lipsky, Soviet scientist, botanist (b. 1863)
 Beyene Merid, Ethiopian military commander (b. 1897)
 Sir Guy Standing, British actor (b. 1873)
 February 27
 Douglas Carnegie, British politician (b. 1870)
 Charles Donnelly, Irish poet (killed in battle) (b. 1915)

March

 March 6 – John Ellis Martineau, American politician (b. 1873)
 March 7 – Concepción Cabrera de Armida, Mexican Roman Catholic mystic and blessed (b. 1862)
 March 8
 Yuriy Kotsiubynsky, Soviet politician, activist (b. 1896)
 Howie Morenz, Canadian ice hockey player (b. 1902)
 March 9 – Paul Elmer More, American critic, essayist (b. 1864)
 March 11 – Joseph S. Cullinan, American oil industrialist, founder of Texaco (b. 1860)
 March 12
 Jenő Hubay, Hungarian composer, violinist (b. 1858)
 Charles-Marie Widor, French organist, composer (b. 1844)
 March 13 – Elihu Thomson, English-American engineer and inventor, co-founder of General Electric (b. 1853)
 March 15 – H. P. Lovecraft, American writer (b. 1890)
 March 16 – Sir Austen Chamberlain, British statesman, Nobel Peace Prize recipient (b. 1863)
 March 18 
 Mélanie Bonis, French composer (b. 1858)
 Felix Graf von Bothmer, German general (b. 1852)
 Julio Sanchez Gardel, Argentine dramatist (b. 1870)
 March 20
 Arthur Bernède, French writer, poet and playwright (b. 1870)
 Harry Vardon, English golf professional (b. 1870)
 March 22
 Thorvald Aagaard, Danish composer (b. 1877)
 Alfred Dyke Acland, British military officer (b. 1858)
 Vladimir Maksimov, Soviet actor (b. 1880)
 Mary Russell, Duchess of Bedford, British aviator, ornithologist (plane crash) (b. 1865)
 March 25 – John Drinkwater, British poet, dramatist (b. 1882)
 March 27 – Victor Gustav Bloede, Swedish chemist (b. 1849)
 March 28 – Josef Klička, Czechoslovak organist, violinist and composer (b. 1855)
 March 29
 Fyodor Keneman, Soviet pianist, composer (b. 1873)
 Karol Szymanowski, Polish composer (b. 1882)
 Kim You-jeong, Korean novelist (b. 1908)
 March 31 – Ahmed Izzet Pasha, Turkish general (b. 1864)

April

 April 2 – Nathan Birnbaum, Austrian writer, journalist (b. 1864)
 April 4
 Sultan Abd al-Hafid of Morocco (b. 1875)
 Maria Teresa Casini, Italian Roman Catholic nun and blessed (b. 1864)
 April 5 – Jose Benlliure y Gil, Spanish painter (b. 1858)
 April 6 – Gyula Juhász, Hungarian poet (b. 1883)
 April 7 – Helen Burgess, American actress (b. 1916)
 April 8 – Billy Bassett, English association footballer (b. 1869)
 April 10
 Ralph Ince, American film director (b. 1887)
 Shridhar Venkatesh Ketkar, Indian sociologist, historian (b. 1884)
 April 14 – Ned Hanlon, American baseball manager, MLB Hall of Famer (b. 1857)
 April 16 – Jay Johnson Morrow, American military engineer, politician and 3rd Governor of the Panama Canal Zone (b. 1870)
 April 19
 Martin Conway, 1st Baron Conway of Allington, British art critic, mountaineer (b. 1856)
 William Morton Wheeler, American entomologist (b. 1865)
 April 20
 Gaston Chérau, French journalist (b. 1872)
 Josef Mařatka, Czech sculptor (b. 1874)
 April 21 – Saima Harmaja, Finnish poet (b. 1913)
 April 22 – Arthur Edmund Carewe, Armenian-American actor (b. 1884)
 April 23 – Caroline Harris, American actress (b. 1867)
 April 24 – Lucy Beaumont, British actress (b. 1869)
 April 25 – Michał Drzymała, Polish rebel (b. 1857)
 April 27 – Antonio Gramsci, Italian Communist writer, politician (b. 1891)
 April 29 
 Wallace Carothers, American chemist, inventor of nylon (b. 1896)
 William Gillette, American actor (b. 1853)

May

 May 1
 Snitz Edwards, Hungarian actor (b. 1868)
 Herbert Hughes, Irish composer (b. 1882)
 May 2 – Takuji Iwasaki, Japanese meteorologist (b. 1869)
 May 4 – Noel Rosa, Brazilian songwriter (b. 1910)
 May 5
 Camillo Berneri, Italian philosopher, anarchist (b. 1897)
 C.K.G. Billings, American horseman (b. 1861)
 May 7 – Ernst A. Lehmann, German captain of the Hindenburg (b. 1886)
 May 9
 Harry Barton, American architect (b. 1876)
 Maurice Conner, Canadian politician (b. 1868)
 May 10 – Sir James Blindell, British politician (b. 1884)
 May 11 
 Afonso Costa, Portuguese lawyer, professor, politician and 3-time Prime Minister of Portugal (b. 1871)
 Ellen Hansell, American tennis champion (b. 1869)
 May 15 – Percy Lee Gassaway, American politician (b. 1885)
 May 23 – John D. Rockefeller, American industrialist, philanthropist (b. 1839)
 May 24
 Luis F. Álvarez, Spanish physician (b. 1853)
 Francis Bird, Australian architect  (b. 1845)
 May 25 – Henry Ossawa Tanner, American artist (b. 1859)
 May 26 – Bertha May Crawford, Canadian opera singer (b. 1886)
 May 28 – Alfred Adler, Austrian psychologist (b. 1870)
 May 29 – Lizardo García, 17th President of Ecuador (b. 1844)

June

 June 2 – Louis Vierne, French composer (b. 1870)
 June 3
 Hugo Hammarskjöld, Swedish public servant, politician (b. 1845)
 Emilio Mola, Spanish Nationalist commander (plane crash) (b. 1887)
 June 4
 Fernand Cabrol, French theologian (b. 1855)
 Keke Geladze, mother of Joseph Stalin, Leader of the Soviet Union (b. 1858)
 June 7 – Jean Harlow, American actress (b. 1911)
 June 10
 Jane Foss Barff, American activist (b. 1863)
 Sir Robert Borden, Canadian lawyer, politician and 8th Prime Minister of Canada (b. 1854)
 Malcolm Williams, American actor (b. 1870)
 June 12 – Mikhail Tukhachevsky, Soviet Army officer, Red Army commander-in-chief (executed) (b. 1893)
 June 16 – Alexander Chervyakov, Leader of the Soviet Union (b. 1892)
 June 18
 Pierre Bodard, French painter (b. 1881)
 Gaston Doumergue, 60th Prime Minister of France, 13th President of France (b. 1863)
 June 19 – J. M. Barrie, British novelist, dramatist (b. 1860)
 June 20 – Andreu Nin Pérez, Spanish politician (b. 1892)
 June 25
 Colin Clive, British actor (b. 1900)
 Marta Cunningham, American opera singer (b. 1869)
 June 26 – Minoru Murata, Japanese actor, director and screenwriter (b. 1894)
 June 27 – Sandro Akhmeteli, Soviet director (b. 1866)
 June 28 – Max Adler, Austrian Marxist theorist (b. 1873)

July

 July 1
 Ilya Garkavyi, Soviet general (b. 1888)
 Matvei Vasilenko, Soviet komkor (b. 1888)
 July 2 – Amelia Earhart, American aviator (missing on this date) (b. 1897) 
 July 3 – Boris Gorbachyov, Soviet general (b. 1892)
 July 6
 Bohdan Ihor Antonych, Soviet poet (b. 1909)
 Ernesto Badini, Italian opera singer (b. 1876)
 July 7 – Åke Hammarskjöld, Swedish diplomat, lawyer (b. 1893)
 July 8 – Diana Abgar, Armenian diplomat (b. 1859)
 July 9 – Oliver Law, American labor organizer, Army officer (killed in Spanish Civil War) (b. 1899)
 July 10 – Arthur Edmund Seaman, American professor and museum curator (b. 1858)
 July 11
 George Gershwin, American composer (b. 1898)
 Rodrigues Ottolengui, American writer (b. 1861)
 July 12 –  Hugo Charteris, 11th Earl of Wemyss, British politician, public servant (b. 1857)
 July 13
 Mykhailo Boychuk, Soviet painter (b. 1882)
 Victor Laloux, French architect (b. 1850)
 July 14
 Julius Meier, American businessman, politician (b. 1874)
 Joseph Taylor Robinson, American politician (b. 1872)
 July 15 – Walter Gay, American painter (b. 1856)
 July 16 – Vladimir Kirillov, Soviet poet (b. 1889)
 July 17 
 Annie Furuhjelm, Finnish feminist activist, politician (b. 1859)
 Percy Gardner, British archaeologist (b. 1846)
 July 18 
 Julian Bell, British poet (killed in Spanish Civil War) (b. 1908)
 Grigol Giorgadze, Soviet historian, jurist and politician (b. 1879)
 July 20 – Guglielmo Marconi, Italian-born American inventor (b. 1874)
 July 22
 Nazzareno Formosa, American Roman Catholic priest and reverend (b. 1901)
 Paolo Iashvili, Soviet poet (b. 1894)
 July 23 – Varnava, Serbian Patriarch (b. 1880)
 July 31 – Noë Bloch, Soviet producer (b. 1875)

August

 August 5 – Jean Louis Conneau, French aviator (b. 1880)
 August 6
 Adeodato Barreto, Portuguese poet (b. 1905)
 F. C. S. Schiller, German-British philosopher (b. 1864)
 August 8 – Martin Rázus, Czechoslovakian poet, writer and politician (b. 1888)
 August 9 – Na Woon-gyu, Korean actor, director and screenwriter (b. 1902)
 August 11 – Edith Wharton, American writer (b. 1862)
 August 13 – Sigizmund Levanevsky, Soviet aircraft pilot (b. 1902)
 August 19
 Alexander Hotovitzky, Russian Orthodox priest, missionary and saint (b. 1872)
 Asaichi Isobe, Japanese army officer (b. 1905)
 Ivan Kataev, Russian novelist, writer (b. 1902)
 August 22
 Owen Burns, American entrepreneur (b. 1869)
 Gelegdorjiin Demid, Russian political military figure (b. 1900)
 August 24 – Gervase Beckett, British politician (b. 1866)
 August 26
 Christos Christovasilis, Greek journalist, author (b. 1861)
 Andrew Mellon, American banker, U.S. Secretary of the Treasury (b. 1855)
 August 30
 Gaetano Bisleti, Italian cardinal (b. 1856)
 Tomás António Garcia Rosado, Portuguese general (b. 1854)
August 31 – Ruth Baldwin, British socialite (b. 1905)

September

 September 2
 Virendranath Chattopadhyaya, Indian revolutionary hero (b. 1880)
 Pierre de Coubertin, 2nd President of the International Olympic Committee (b. 1863)
 September 3 – François Guiguet, French painter (b. 1860)
 September 4
 Daniel Alexander Cameron, Canadian politician (b. 1870)
 Juan Campisteguy, Uruguayan lawyer, soldier and 25th President of Uruguay (b. 1859)
 September 5 – David Hendricks Bergey, American bacteriologist (b. 1860)
 September 6 – Harry Charles Purvis Bell, British civil servant, commissioner (b. 1851)
 September 8 – Frank Alexander, American actor (b. 1879)
 September 9 
 Mikhail Diterikhs, Russian general (b. 1874)
 Géza Horváth, Hungarian doctor, entomologist (b. 1847)
 September 11 – Nazmi Ziya Güran, Turkish painter (b. 1881)
 September 13 – Ellis Parker Butler, American humorist (b. 1869)
 September 14 – Tomáš Garrigue Masaryk, Czechoslovakian politician, sociologist, philosopher and 1st President of Czechoslovakia (b. 1850)
 September 15
 Anders Bundgaard, Danish sculptor (b. 1864)
 Clifford Heatherley, British actor (b. 1888)
 September 20
 Maksymilian Horwitz, Polish socialist, communist activist (b. 1877)
 Lev Karakhan, Soviet revolutionary hero, diplomat (b. 1889)
 September 21 – Osgood Perkins, American actor (b. 1892)
 September 23 – Cleto González Víquez, 18th and 26th President of Costa Rica (b. 1858)
 September 22 – Ruth Roland, American actress (b. 1892)
 September 26
 Bessie Smith, African-American blues singer (b. 1894)
 Edward Filene, American businessman, philanthropist (b. 1860)
 September 27 – Alikhan Bukeikhanov, Kazakh statesman, politician, publicist, teacher, writer and Prime Minister of Alash Autonomy (b. 1866)
 September 29 – Ray Ewry, American Olympic athlete (b. 1873)

October

 October 1 – Prince Kuni Taka of Japan (b. 1875)
 October 3 
 Baden Baden-Powell, American aviator pioneer (b. 1860)
 Richard Hertwig, German zoologist (b. 1850)
 October 6 – Angelo Musco, Italian actor (b. 1872)
 October 9 
 August de Boeck, Flemish composer (b. 1865)
 Ernest Louis, Grand Duke of Hesse, German prince (b. 1868)
 October 10 – Peter of Krutitsy, Soviet Orthodox priest, martyr and metropolitan (b. 1862)
 October 11 – Emma E. Bower, American physician, club-woman, and newspaperwoman (b. 1852)
 October 13 – Kazimierz Nowak, Polish traveller (b. 1897)
 October 14 – Salvatore Micalizzi, Italian Roman Catholic priest and venerable (b.  1856)
 October 15 – James Marcus, American actor (b.  1867)
 October 16 
 Jean de Brunhoff, French writer (b. 1899)
 William Sealy Gosset, English chemist and statistician (b. 1876)
 October 17
 J. Bruce Ismay, English businessman (b. 1862)
 Antônio Parreiras, Brazilian painter, illustrator (b. 1860)
 October 19
 Pedro Chutró, Argentine physician (b. 1880)
 Ernest Rutherford, New Zealand physicist, Nobel Prize in Chemistry recipient (b. 1871)
 October 23 – Nikolai Klyuev, Russian poet (b. 1884)
 October 26 – Józef Dowbor-Muśnicki, Polish general (b. 1867)
 October 27
 Joseph-Félix Bouchor, French painter (b. 1853)
 Abdul Karim Khan, Indian classical singer (b. 1872)
 October 29 – Kazimierz Cichowski, Polish-born Soviet politician (b. 1887)
 October 30
 Mendel Khatayevich, Soviet politician (b. 1893)
 Ivan Zhukov, Soviet politician (b. 1889)

November

 November 1 – Ivar Bauck, Norwegian general (b. 1863)
 November 2 – Félix Gaffiot, French philologist (b. 1870)
 November 4
 William Bennett, British politician (b. 1873)
 Alfred Walter Campbell, Australian neurologist (b.  1868)
 Gustav Gärtner, Austrian pathologist (b. 1855)
 Emil Hassler, Swiss physician, botanist (b. 1864)
 November 5 – Naoe Kinoshita, Japanese Christian socialist (b. 1869)
 November 6 – Sir Johnston Forbes-Robertson, British stage actor (b. 1853)
 November 8
Francis de Croisset, Belgian-born French playwright (b. 1877)
Giovanni De Briganti, Italian aviator (b. 1892)
 November 9 – Ramsay MacDonald, British statesman, 2-time Prime Minister of the United Kingdom (b. 1866)
 November 10 – Nikolai Batalov, Soviet actor (b. 1899)
 November 11 – Uryū Sotokichi, Japanese admiral (b. 1857)
 November 13 – Mrs. Leslie Carter (Caroline Louise Dudley), American actress  (b. 1857)
 November 15 – Eero Järnefelt, Finnish realist painter (b. 1863)
 November 16
 Némèse Garneau, Canadian politician (b. 1847)
 Princess Cecilie of Greece and Denmark, wife of Hereditary Grand Duke Georg Donatus of Hesse, and sister of Prince Philip, Duke of Edinburgh (b. 1911)
 November 17 – Jack Worrall, Australian cricketer, coach (b. 1860)
 November 20 – Metropolitan Joseph (Petrovykh) of the Soviet Union (b. 1872)
 November 23
 Miklós Kovács, Hungarian-born Yugoslav poet (b. 1857)
 Jagadish Chandra Bose, Indian physicist (b. 1858)
 George Albert Boulenger, Belgian naturalist (b. 1858)
 November 25
 Aleksandr Glagolev, Russian Orthodox priest, religious philosopher and saint (b. 1872)
 Alessandro Padoa, Italian mathematician (b. 1868)
 Raymond Stanton Patton, American admiral, engineer and second Director of the United States Coast and Geodetic Survey (b. 1882)
 November 26 – Peljidiin Genden, Mongolian political figure, 9th Prime Minister of Mongolia and 2nd President of Mongolia (b. 1892)
 November 27
 Vsevolod Balitsky, Leader of the Soviet Union (b. 1892)
 Eero Haapalainen, Finnish Communist leader, activist (b. 1880)
 Felix Hamrin, 22nd Prime Minister of Sweden (b. 1875)
 Vasyl Lypkivsky, Soviet Orthodox priest, metropolitan (b. 1864)
 Wilhelm Weinberg, German physician (b. 1862)
 November 28 – Magnús Guðmundsson, Icelandic politician, 3rd Prime Minister of Iceland (b. 1879)

December

 December 1 – Rao Guohua, Chinese general of the National Revolutionary Army (b. 1894)
 December 2 – Josep Comas i Solà, Andorran astronomer (b. 1868)
 December 3
 Attila József, Hungarian poet (b. 1905)
 Prosper Poullet, Belgian politician, 26th Prime Minister of Belgium (b. 1868)
 Yue Yiqin, Chinese flying ace (b. 1914)
 December 4 
 Ralph Lewis, American actor (b. 1872)
 Sir Sahibzada Abdul Qayyum, Indian politician and educationist (b. 1863)
 December 8 
 Hans Molisch, Czech-Austrian botanist (b. 1856)
 Akhmet Baitursynov, Kazakh poet, politician, turkologist (b. 1872)
 December 9
 Lilias Armstrong, British phonetician (b. 1882)
 Gustaf Dalén, Swedish physicist, Nobel Prize laureate (b. 1869)
 December 10 – Robert Bolder, British actor (b. 1859)
 December 12 – Alfred Abel, German actor (b. 1879)
 December 14 – Fabián de la Rosa, Filipino painter (b. 1869)
 December 16 – Giorgi Mazniashvili, Soviet general (b. 1870)
 December 17 – Dimitrie Călugăreanu, Romanian physician, naturalist and physiologist (b. 1868)
 December 18 – Robert Worth Bingham, American politician (b. 1871)
 December 20 – Erich Ludendorff, German general (b. 1865)
 December 21
 Meliton Balanchivadze, Soviet composer (b. 1862)
 Ted Healy, American actor (b. 1896)
 Frank B. Kellogg, United States Secretary of State, Nobel Peace Prize recipient (b. 1856)
 December 22 – Joseph Darby, British jumper (b. 1861)
 December 23 – Osman Nuri Hadžić, Bosnian writer (b. 1869)
 December 25 – Newton D. Baker, 37th Mayor of Cleveland, Ohio, United States Secretary of War (b. 1871)
 December 27 – Sir Coote Hedley, British army officer and sportsman (b. 1865)
 December 28 
 Herbert Bullmore, Scottish Rugby Union international player, grandfather of Kerry Packer (b. 1874)
 Maurice Ravel, French composer (Boléro) (b. 1875)
 Sir Algernon Thomas, New Zealand scientist (b. 1857)
 December 29
 Frederik Beichmann, Norwegian jurist (b. 1859)
 Don Marquis, American poet (b. 1878)
 December 30 – Hans Niels Andersen, Danish businessman, founder of the East Asiatic Company (b. 1852)
 December 31 – Dezső Czigány, Hungarian painter (b. 1883)

Nobel Prizes

 Physics – Clinton Joseph Davisson, George Paget Thomson
 Chemistry – Walter Haworth, Paul Karrer
 Physiology or Medicine – Albert von Szent-Györgyi Nagyrapolt
 Literature – Roger Martin du Gard
 Peace – Robert Cecil

References

Links
 1937 WWII Timeline 
The 1930s Timeline: 1937 – from American Studies Programs at The University of Virginia